Muscle Creek is a locality a part of Muswellbrook local government area in the Hunter Region of New South Wales. It is located south of Muswellbrook and gets its name from the creek of the same name that feeds into the Hunter River at Muswellbrook.

References 

Suburbs of Muswellbrook Shire